Angelo Carmen Christopher Moore (born November 5, 1965) is an American musician, best known for his work as lead singer and saxophonist for the Los Angeles ska and funk metal band Fishbone. Moore also performs and records under the stage name Dr. Madd Vibe.

Biography
Moore grew up in Southern California's San Fernando Valley and attended Hale Junior High School in Woodland Hills, where he met the other members of Fishbone's original lineup. Moore's father played saxophone for Count Basie, and his parents exposed him to jazz, soul and funk music. He then attended El Camino Real High School in Woodland Hills.

In addition to his regular duties with Fishbone, in 1993 Moore released a poetry anthology titled Dr. Madd Vibe's Comprehensive Linkology. In 1997 he released his first solo CD, also titled Dr. Madd Vibe's Comprehensive Linkology, as well as his first video titled The Delusional Quandaries Of Dr. Madd Vibe. In 2000 Moore released another CD/video set titled The Yin-Yang Thang, and in 2006 he released the CD Dr. Madd Vibe's Medicine Cabinet. Moore also made a cameo appearance as the bandleader in the movie Idlewild, featuring Outkast members Big Boi and Andre 3000. On June 26, 2012, Angelo Moore and the Rondo Brothers released the single "Brand New Step" under Ninth Street Opus record label.

Moore in July 2021 played the role of Manager in the music video for "Holier than Thou", a Metallica cover song by Off!.

In 2022, Moore participated in the "Celebrating David Bowie" tour, featuring Adrian Belew, Todd Rundgren, and others.

Discography

Fishbone

1985 - Fishbone
1986 - In Your Face
1987 - It's a Wonderful Life ep
1988 - Truth and Soul
1990 - Set the Booty Up Right ep
1991 - The Reality of My Surroundings
1993 - Give a Monkey a Brain...
1996 - Chim Chim's Badass Revenge
2000 - The Psychotic Friends Nuttwerx
2002 - The Friendliest Psychosis of All
2002 - Live at Temple Bar
2006 - Still Stuck in Your Throat
2011 - Crazy Glue ep
2014 - Intrinsically Intertwined ep

Solo/Dr. Madd Vibe
2000 - Angelo Moore Is Dr. Madd Vibe: The Ying Yang Thang
2000 - Dr. Madd Vibe Comprehensive Linkology 
2005 - Dr. Madd Vibe's Medicine Cabinet
2010 - Madd Vibe En Dub
2012 - The Angelo Show - The Olegna Phenomenon
2012 - Brand New Step (Ninth Street Opus)
2016 - Brand New Step - Centuries of Heat

Albums featured
1987 - The Boldness Of Style (by Thelonious Monster, saxophone on "If I")
1987 - The Uplift Mofo Party Plan (by Red Hot Chili Peppers, background vocals on "Organic Anti-Beat Box Band")
1988 - Nothing's Shocking (by Jane's Addiction, saxophone on "Idiots Rule")
1989 - Back with a Bong (by Murphy's Law, saxophone)
1992 - Eyes Wide Open (by David Garza, backing vocals on "Virgin Mary Candle")
1997 - Hang-Ups (by Goldfinger, saxophone and vocals on "Carlita")
1998 - Boggy Depot (by Jerry Cantrell, saxophone on "Cut You In" and "Cold Piece")
2000 - Menace to Sobriety (by OPM, vocals on "Better Daze" and "Unda", saxophone on "Unda")
2001 - The Crucial Conspiracy (by The Dingees, saxophone, theremin, and vocals)
2003 - Barb4ry (by Ez3kiel, vocals on "Thought")
2004 - White Trash Beautiful (by Everlast, theremin on "Broken")
2006 - The Sweet Escape (by Gwen Stefani, saxophone on "Fluorescent")
2006 - "Big Bang (by Enneri Blaka, lead vocals in "White Coats", spoken word and theremin in "Blue Collars")
2007 - Chronchitis (by Slightly Stoopid, vocals on "Ever Really Wanted")
2011 - Shoot The Freak'  (by CQMD, vocals on "Gone With The Wind")
2011 - Higher Guns (by The Void Union, vocals on "Fly-A-Me-Away")
2012 - Walkin'  (by Tokyo Ska Paradise Orchestra, vocals on "All Good Ska is One")
2012 - Top of the World (by Slightly Stoopid, vocals on "Ska Diddy")
2012 - Stairway to Hell (by Ugly Kid Joe, saxophone on "Love Ain't True!")
2013 - Dub Rockers Vol. 1 ''(With Bad Brains on song "Raga Dub)
2015 - "Coop DeVille presents Bat Funk Crazy... In 3D!!! " (by Ishan Cooper, vocals on "Science Of Pants" and "One Time Spacesuit")
2016 - "The Stage" (by Avenged Sevenfold on song "Sunny Disposition")
2021 - "SKA DREAM" (by Jeff Rosenstock saxophone solo on "p i c k i t u p")

References

External links
 Dr. Madd Vibe
 IMDB: Angelo Moore

1965 births
Living people
Musicians from Los Angeles
African-American rock musicians
African-American rock singers
American male singers
American punk rock singers
American ska singers
Fishbone members
El Camino Real High School alumni
21st-century African-American people
20th-century African-American people